The Minister responsible for the Manitoba Telephone System was a cabinet position in the Government of Manitoba charged with overseeing the Manitoba Telephone System (MTS). It was not a full portfolio, but was invariably held by ministers with other cabinet responsibilities.

The position was created in 1970, and discontinued in 1999.

List of Ministers responsible for the Manitoba Telephone System

Toupin was designated as minister responsible for the Manitoba Telephone System and Communications.
Plohman, Uskiw and Mackling were designated as ministers responsible for the Manitoba Telephone System Act.

References 

Manitoba Telephone System, Minister responsible for the
Communications in Manitoba